Amos Richard Webber (January 21, 1852 – February 25, 1948) was an American lawyer and politician who served as a U.S. Representative from Ohio from 1904 to 1907.

Biography 
Born in Hinckley, Ohio, Webber attended the public schools of Hinckley and was graduated from Baldwin University, Berea, Ohio, in 1876.  He studied law, was admitted to the bar in 1876 and commenced practice in Elyria, Ohio.  He served as prosecuting attorney of Lorain County 1884-1890.  He served as judge of the Court of Common Pleas of Lorain County 1900-1903.

Webber was elected as a Republican to the Fifty-eighth Congress to fill the vacancy caused by the death of William W. Skiles.  He was reelected to the Fifty-ninth Congress and served from November 8, 1904, to March 3, 1907.
He was an unsuccessful candidate for renomination in 1906.  He resumed the practice of law in Elyria, Ohio, and also engaged in literary pursuits.

Webber was again elected in 1922 judge of the court of common pleas, serving until his retirement in 1935.
He died in Elyria, Ohio, February 25, 1948.  He was interred in Ridgelawn Cemetery.

External links 

 Encyclopedia of Baldwin Wallace History: Amos Webber

Sources

1852 births
1948 deaths
Baldwin Wallace University alumni
People from Hinckley, Ohio
People from Elyria, Ohio
Ohio lawyers
Republican Party members of the United States House of Representatives from Ohio